Churchtown is an unincorporated community and census-designated place (CDP) in Caernarvon Township, Lancaster County, Pennsylvania, United States, along Pennsylvania Route 23. The population was 470 as of the 2010 census.

History
The first settlers of the oldest Amish settlement still in existence, the Lancaster Amish settlement, settled near Churchtown.

The Bangor Episcopal Church, Caernarvon Presbyterian Church and Edward Davies House are listed on the National Register of Historic Places.

Geography
Churchtown is in eastern Lancaster County, in the center of Caernarvon Township. Pennsylvania Route 23 is the community's Main Street, leading east  to Morgantown and west  to Lancaster, the county seat.

The community sits on a ridge draining south to the Conestoga River, a west-flowing tributary of the Susquehanna River.

Demographics

References

Populated places in Lancaster County, Pennsylvania
Census-designated places in Lancaster County, Pennsylvania